Charles Pratt Jr. (born January 6, 1955) is an American television writer, producer and director.

In September 2014, it was revealed that Pratt had been hired as head writer and co-executive producer of The Young and the Restless. In September 2016, it was confirmed that Pratt was leaving his position at The Young and the Restless to become show-runner and executive producer of the primetime series Star. In 2021, He was hired to be a producer on the Disney Channel Original Mystery Series, Secrets of Sulphur Springs. The show premiered in January.

Daytime soap opera positions held
All My Children (hired by Brian Frons)
Head writer: August 27, 2008 – February 15, 2010
Co-head writer (with Lorraine Broderick): February 8 – 15, 2010
Consulting producer: August 20, 2008 – November 2009

General Hospital
Consulting producer: May 2004 – March 28, 2006
Head writer (with Robert Guza Jr.): June 13, 2002 – March 10, 2006
Script Writer: 1982–1984

Santa Barbara
Script Writer: 1985–1986
Co-head writer (with Anne Howard Bailey): December 1986 – January 1989
Head writer: January 1989 – May 1990

Sunset Beach
Created show with Robert Guza Jr. and Josh Griffith
Executive Storyline Consultant: 1997

The Young and the Restless (hired by Jill Farren Phelps)
Head writer: January 16, 2015 – December 6, 2016
Executive Producer (with Jill Farren Phelps): January 16, 2015 – July 12, 2016; (with Mal Young): July 13, 2016 – December 6, 2016

Other positions held
Beverly Hills, 90210
Director: January 28, 1998 – "Rebound"

Cruel Intentions 2
Executive Producer: 2001

Desperate Housewives
Executive Producer: Pilot
Consulting Producer: 2004–2006

Gabriel's Fire
Executive Storyline Consultant: 1991
Writer: 1990-1991; "Postcards from the Faultline", "Belly of the Beast", “Windows”

The Lying Game 
Executive Producer: 2011–2013
Developer

Melrose Place
Writer: July 15, 1992 – May 24, 1999
Supervising Producer: 1993–1994
Co-Executive Producer: September 11, 1995 – May 24, 1999
Director: 1996–1999
Wrote and directed the last episode

Models Inc.
Executive Producer: 1994-1995

Pacific Palisades
Consultant
Director

The Colbys
Writer: January 16, 1986 – "The Turning Point"

Titans
Head writer: 2000
Executive Producer: 2000

Ugly Betty
Consulting Producer: 2007–2010

Secrets of a Small Town
Creator: 2006

The Apostles (directed by David McNally)
Creator: 2008

Full House
Writer: "A Pinch for a Pinch" aired on October 26, 1990.

Star
Executive Producer: 2016–2017

Awards and nominations
Pratt has been nominated for multiple Daytime Emmys. He won the 1991 Emmy for Outstanding Writing Team, with Sheri Anderson, Samuel D. Ratcliffe, Maralyn Thoma, Josh Griffith, Robert Guza Jr., Linda Hammer, Lynda Myles, Frank Salisbury, and Richard Culliton.

Head writing tenure

Executive producing tenure

References

External links

ScriptMag
UltimateDallas

Hired As AMC HW

American soap opera writers
Place of birth missing (living people)
American male television writers
American television directors
Living people
American television producers
Soap opera producers
1955 births